WRZC-LP (92.3 FM) was a radio station licensed to Red Cliff, Wisconsin, United States. The station was owned by First American Prevention Center.

Its license was cancelled by the Federal Communications Commission on February 13, 2013, due to the station not filing a renewal application before the December 1, 2012 expiry date.

References

External links
 

RZC-LP
RXC-LP
Radio stations disestablished in 2013
Defunct radio stations in the United States
2013 disestablishments in Wisconsin
RZC-LP